Snite may refer to:

Betsy Snite (1938–1984), American alpine ski racer 
Snite Museum of Art at the University of Notre Dame, Indiana, U.S.
John Taylor Snite House in Illinois, U.S.